Ocean Breeze, formerly Ocean Breeze Park, is a town on the Indian River in Martin County, Florida, United States. Ocean Breeze and Briny Breezes in Palm Beach County are the only two towns in Florida in which all residents live in a mobile home park bearing the name of the town. The population was 301 at the 2020 census. The population figures do not include the many part-time winter residents from other places. The town is bordered on three sides by the unincorporated community of Jensen Beach.

Ocean Breeze is part of the Port St. Lucie Metropolitan Statistical Area, which includes all of Martin and St. Lucie counties.

History
Ocean Breeze Trailer Park was established in 1938 north of Stuart, Florida, by Harry Hoke.

The Ocean Breeze Park town government was formed in 1960 when 142 property owners in Ocean Breeze Trailer Park voted to incorporate. Harry Hoke was elected as the town's first mayor. Evans Crary, Sr., who guided the town through the legal procedure of incorporation, was appointed town attorney. At the time of its incorporation, the 65-acre park was said to be the largest privately owned trailer park in the United States. By referendum held December 18, 2012, the town changed its name to "Ocean Breeze".

Dorothy Geeben, mayor from 2001 to 2010, was re-elected in 2004 at age 96, and was identified as the United States' oldest mayor. Mayor Geeben died on January 11, 2010, at the age of 101 just short of her 102nd birthday.  The current mayor is Karen M. Ostrand (2016–present).

Geography

The town of Ocean Breeze is bounded on the east by the Indian River and on the south, west and north by the unincorporated community of Jensen Beach.

Layout
The town consists of three sections:
 "Ocean Breeze RV Resort"(Sun Communities), where residents live
 A shopping center, "Ocean Breeze Plaza", anchored by a Publix super market
 An undeveloped area of high sugar sand dunes

All roads within the town are private, connecting to CR 707. The town is served by the Jensen Beach post office.

Demographics

As of the census of 2000, there were 463 people, 335 households, and 107 families residing in the town. The racial makeup of the town was 98.49% White, 1.08% African American, and 0.43% from two or more races. Hispanic or Latino of any race were 1.08% of the population.

There were 335 households, out of which 0.3% had children under the age of 18 living with them, 26.9% were married couples living together, 4.8% had a female householder with no husband present, and 67.8% were non-families. 63.6% of all households were made up of individuals, and 43.9% had someone living alone who was 65 years of age or older. The average household size was 1.38 and the average family size was 2.05.

In the town, the population was spread out, with 0.2% under the age of 18, 0.4% from 18 to 24, 5.4% from 25 to 44, 27.4% from 45 to 64, and 66.5% who were 65 years of age or older. The median age was 70 years. For every 100 females, there were 83.0 males. For every 100 females age 18 and over, there were 83.3 males.

The median income for a household in the town was $15,709, and the median income for a family was $27,813. Males had a median income of $17,083 versus $25,208 for females. The per capita income for the town was $19,802, which ranks it 418 out of 887 towns in Florida. About 14.6% of families and 15.3% of the population were below the poverty line, including none of those under age 18 and 12.7% of those age 65 or over.

References

Towns in Martin County, Florida
Port St. Lucie metropolitan area
Jensen Beach, Florida
Towns in Florida
Populated places on the Intracoastal Waterway in Florida